Alexa Fairchild (born 23 November 1994, New York) is a Belgian equestrian athlete and fashion designer. Fairchild started riding at a young age and competed in the youth dressage classes, including the European Youth Championships in Compiegne, France where she won a bronze team medal. In 2021 she was named as traveling reserve by the Belgian Equestrian Federation for the 2020 Olympic Games in Tokyo. A month later she competed at the European Dressage Championships in Hagen, Germany.

Besides her equestrian career, Fairchild is also a businesswoman and fashion designer. In 2017 she launched her own clothing brand.

References

1994 births
Living people
Belgian female equestrians
Belgian dressage riders
21st-century Belgian women